Uthangarai taluk is a rural taluk of Krishnagiri district of the Indian state of Tamil Nadu. The headquarters is the town of Uthangarai.

Areas in the taluk
There is one town, the headquarters panchayat town of Uthangarai, and 182 villages in Uthangarai taluk, with the largest village being Thandiyappanoor with a 2011 census population of 2240. The villages are:

Demographics
According to the 2011 census, the taluk of Uthangarai had a population of 212,970 with 109,567 males and 103,403 females. There were 944 women for every 1,000 men. The taluk had a literacy rate of 64.73%. Child population in the age group below 6 years were 11,480 Males and 10,247 Females.

References 

Taluks of Krishnagiri district